Paul Turner (born 4 July 2000) is a professional rugby league footballer who plays as a  for the St George Illawarra Dragons in the NRL.

He previously played for the New Zealand Warriors in the National Rugby League.

Background
Turner played his junior rugby league for the Hikurangi Stags.

Career

2020
Turner made his first grade debut in round 15 of the 2020 NRL season for the Warriors against the Canterbury-Bankstown Bulldogs.

2022
Turner joined the Gold Coast Titans in 2022. He made his Titans debut in his side's 30−16 loss to the South Sydney Rabbitohs at Robina Stadium in round 14 of the 2022 NRL season.

References

External links
Gold Coast Titans profile
Warriors profile

2000 births
Living people
New Zealand rugby league players
Rugby league halfbacks
Rugby league five-eighths
Rugby league players from Northland Region
New Zealand Warriors players
Gold Coast Titans players